= PYCARD-AS1 =

Non-coding RNA in humans

Identifiers
- Aliases: PYCARD-AS1, C16orf98, PYCARDOS, PYCARD antisense RNA 1
- External IDs: GeneCards: PYCARD-AS1

Gene location (Human)
Chr.	Chromosome 16 (human)
Band	16p11.2	Start	31,201,885 bp
Band	16p11.2	End	31,203,452 bp
RNA expression pattern
Bgee	Human / Mouse (ortholog); Top expressed in: buccal mucosa cell; gonad; mucosa of transverse colon; granulocyte; monocyte; pharynx; stromal cell of endometrium; bone marrow cell; blood; upper respiratory tract / n/a; More reference expression data
BioGPS	n/a
Orthologs
Databases	NCBI: entry; OMA: entry
Species	Human	Mouse
Entrez	100652740	n/a
Ensembl	ENSG00000261359	n/a
UniProt	n a	n/a
RefSeq (mRNA)	n/a	n/a
RefSeq (protein)	n/a	n/a
Location (UCSC)	Chr 16: 31.2 – 31.2 Mb	n/a
PubMed search		n/a
- Wikidata
View/Edit Human

PYCARD antisense RNA 1 is a non-coding RNA that in humans is encoded by the PYCARD-AS1 gene.
